This is a list of transactions that have taken place during the 2020 NBA off-season and the 2020–21 NBA season.

Retirement

Front office movements

Head coaching changes
Off-season

In-Season

General manager changes

Player movements

Trades

Free agents
On November 9, it was announced that free agency would begin on November 20 at 6 p.m. ET, with signings permitted starting at 12 p.m. ET on November 22.

* Player option
** Team option
*** Early termination option
**** Previously on a two-way contract

Free-agent two-way contracts
Per recent NBA rules implemented as of the 2017–18 season, teams are permitted to have two two-way players on their roster at any given time, in addition to their 15-man regular season roster. A two-way player will provide services primarily to the team's G League affiliate, but can spend up to 45 days with the parent NBA team. Only players with four or fewer years of NBA experience are able to sign two-way contracts, which can be for either one season or two. Players entering training camp for a team have a chance to convert their training camp deal into a two-way contract if they prove themselves worthy enough for it. Teams also have the option to convert a two-way contract into a regular, minimum-salary NBA contract, at which point the player becomes a regular member of the parent NBA team. Two-way players are not eligible for NBA playoff rosters, so a team must convert any two-way players it wants to use in the playoffs, waiving another player in the process.

During the shortened 2020–21 season, two-way deals will work a little differently than usual. Rather than being limited to spending 45 days with their NBA teams, two-way players would be eligible to be active for up to 50 of their team's 72 NBA games. And instead of having their salaries by how many days they spend in the NBA, they'll receive flat salaries of $449,155.

**** Previously on a two-way contract

Going to other American and Canadian leagues

Going overseas

Waived

† Two-way contract

Training camp cuts
All players listed did not make the final roster.

Draft

First round

Second round 

**** Signed two-way contract

Previous years' draftees

* Signed Exhibit 10 Deal

See also

Notes

References

External links
NBA player transactions at NBA.com

Transactions
2020-21